Elk Horn–Kimballton Community School District (EH-K) was a school district headquartered in Elk Horn, Iowa. Its schools were EH-K Elementary School and EH-K High School.

It occupied sections of Audubon and Shelby counties, and it served Elk Horn and Kimballton.

History
It was formed as a merger of the Elk Horn and Kimballton school districts, with 1955 being the opening date. In 1978 an elementary and junior high facility opened. Circa 1998 it had 12 students in preschool and 317 in elementary through high school.

At one point it entered into with the Exira Community School District, in which students from one district attended school in another district. It consolidated with the Exira district into the Exira–Elk Horn–Kimballton Community School District on July 1, 2014. 628 people voted in favor and 82 voted against.

References

External links
 

Defunct school districts in Iowa
Education in Shelby County, Iowa
Education in Audubon County, Iowa
2014 disestablishments in Iowa
School districts disestablished in 2014
School districts established in 1955
1955 establishments in Iowa